James Goronwy Mathias (1842–1895), also known under the pen name Goronwy Ddu, was a Baptist minister and writer.

Religious life 
Mathias was born in Manchester but moved to Penrhyn-Coch when he was young. In 1873, he moved to Aberdare and joined Ynys-lwyd chapel, before moving to Rhymney Valley in 1874 to become pastor of Bethania chapel, Troedrhiw'r-fuwch. In 1875, he took pastoral charge of Ramah and Erwood, Brecknock and later (in 1881) Llansantffraid and Glyndyfrdwy. From 1887 he retired to Corwen but resumed the role of pastor in 1893 at Pontlottyn until his death.

Literary activities 
Mathias made his breakthrough as a writer while living in Corwen. He founded, and was editor of, Y Llenor Cymreig published in Corwen between January 1882 and October 1883. He also edited and helped co-write Hanes Bywyd C. H. Spurgeon, 1892. Writing under the pseudonym Goronwy Ddu, his works include:

Yr Ystorgell, 1872
Y Gorsen, 1872
Yr Eginyn, 1874
Y Dywysen, 1874
Y Dywysen Aeddfed, 1875

Death 
James Goronwy Mathias died on 18 February 1895 aged 53. He is buried at Erwood.

See also 

 Seren Cymru, 29 March 1895
 The Baptist Union of Wales Handbook and Diary, 1896
 Notable Welshmen (1700–1900), 1908
 Eminent Welshmen: a short biographical dictionary of Welshmen ... from the earliest times to the present, 1908
 Geiriadur Bywgraffiadol, yn cynnwys Byr-hanes y Cymry mwyaf adnabyddus fuont yn preswylio yn Manceinion, 1896
 Cardiff Free Libraries, Catalogue of Printed Literature in the Welsh Department, 1898
 David Jenkins, O Blas Gogerddan i Horeb (Taith Dwy Ganrif), Aberystwyth, 1933.

References 

Welsh writers
1842 births
1895 deaths